Counterpoint is an Australian current affairs weekly radio program broadcast by the Australian Broadcasting Corporation's Radio National since May 2004.

Programming of Counterpoint includes a range of subjects that tend towards conservative theories and ideas counter to general popular trends in Australian society. It regularly picks up on threads of conservative sources and material from the United States.

Counterpoint has been active in promoting criticism of the scientific consensus on global warming, and has regularly featured guests who adopt a position of climate change denial. Climate change critics who have appeared on the program include: Bob Carter, Ian Castles, Ray Evans, William Kininmonth, Jennifer Marohasy, David Henderson, Patrick J. Michaels, Bjørn Lomborg, Vincent Gray, and Garth Paltridge.

External links

Notes

Australian Broadcasting Corporation radio programs
Conservatism in Australia